There is a 2009 Turkish drama film written, produced and directed by Hakkı Kurtuluş and Melik Saraçoğlu, which follows 24 hours in the life of a troubled family.

Plot
When the matriarch of an Istanbul family dies in a home for the elderly, the son and the daughter bury their mother and set off to find their father, a recluse in the family house on one of the Princes' Islands. As the three members of the family come together, it turns into a day of painful confrontations.

Release

Premiere

General release 

Festival screenings

Reception

Box Office
The film has made a total gross of $12,858.

See also 
 2009 in film
 Turkish films of 2009

References

External links
 
 

2009 films
2009 drama films
Films set in Turkey
Turkish drama films
2000s Turkish-language films